The Maltese Penguin is a Big Finish Productions audio drama based on the long-running British science fiction television series Doctor Who. It was initially made available as an exclusive bonus to Big Finish series subscribers and was not sold commercially, although it is now available to nonsubscribers.

Plot
Frobisher is employed as a Private Eye to investigate Alicia Mulholland's fiancé, Arthur Gringax. As a penguin detective would be somewhat conspicuous, he instead chooses to disguise himself ... as the Doctor!

Cast
The Doctor — Colin Baker
Frobisher — Robert Jezek
Josiah W Dogbolter — Toby Longworth
Alicia Mulholland — Jane Goddard
Chandler — Alistair Lock

Continuity
Frobisher is a character from the Doctor Who Magazine comics.  He first appeared in their first Sixth Doctor story "The Shape Shifters".  His only other Big Finish story is The Holy Terror.
Dogbolter was also a character from the comics, also appearing in Shape Shifters, and before that, The Moderator.

External links
Big Finish Productions – The Maltese Penguin

2002 audio plays
Sixth Doctor audio plays
Audio plays by Robert Shearman